Ust-Koksinsky District (Kök-Suu Oozı aymak) is an administrative and municipal district (raion), one of the ten in the Altai Republic, Russia. It is located in the west and southwest of the republic. Its administrative center is the rural locality (a selo) of Ust-Koksa. As of the 2010 Census, the total population of the district was 17,020, with the population of Ust-Koksa accounting for 25.7% of that number.

History
The district was established on October 19, 1923 as Uymonsky District within Oirot Autonomous Oblast. It was given its present name on April 10, 1933.

Administrative and municipal status
Within the framework of administrative divisions, Ust-Koksinsky District is one of the ten in the Altai Republic. As a municipal division, the district is incorporated as Ust-Koksinsky Municipal District. Both administrative and municipal districts are divided into the same nine rural settlements, comprising forty-two rural localities. The selo of Ust-Koksa serves as the administrative center of both the administrative and municipal districts.

Nature reserves
The district is home to two nature reserves: Katunsky State Natural Biosphere Reserve and Belukha Nature Park.

References

Notes

Sources

Исполнительный комитет Алтайского краевого Совета народных депутатов. Архивный отдел. Государственный архив Алтайского края. "Справочник административно-территориальных изменений на Алтае, 1917–1980" (Reference Book of the Administrative-Territorial Changes in Altai, 1917–1980). Барнаул, Алтайское книжное издательство, 1987.

Districts of the Altai Republic
States and territories established in 1923